Johannis de Rijke (December 5, 1842 – January 20, 1913) was a Dutch civil engineer and a foreign advisor to the Japanese government in Meiji period Japan.

Early life
De Rijke was born in Colijnsplaat on the island Noord-Beveland.  He was the third of seven children born to farmer and part-time dike worker Pieter de Rijke and his wife, Anna Catharina Liefbroer. He obtained a position with the Dutch Ministry of the Interior as an apprentice to Jacobus Lebret, under whom he studied mathematics, earthwork construction, and hydraulic engineering practices.

Career
In 1865, De Rijke worked for Cornelis Johannes van Doorn building the Oranje lock which closed off the IJ from the Zuiderzee at Schellingwoude near Amsterdam. De Rijke was the chief construction foreman.  When Van Doorn was invited to travel to Japan in 1872, he encouraged De Rijke to join him in re-designing the port of Osaka.

Japan
In September 1873, De Rijke arrived in Japan together with Van Doorn and George Arnold Escher.  During the next thirty years, these three civil engineers developed a range of flood control and water management projects. He improved the ports of Tokyo, Yokohama, Nagasaki, Ujina (Hiroshima), Hakata (Fukuoka), Mikuni (Sakai) and Niigata. His breakwater at the port of Yokkaichi is recognized by the Japanese government as an Important Cultural Property.

De Rijke also developed plans to improve riparian zones of several Japanese rivers. Importantly, De Rijke was responsible for the construction of a tunnel channel from Lake Biwa to Kyoto. 
He is also credited with building the Tokyo Kanda River sewer network.
ーーーーーーーーーーーーーーーーーーーーーーーーーーーーーーーーーーーーーーーーーーーーーーーー
Elementary schools in Aichi Prefecture conduct a tour of circles when they become third graders. At that time, you can see the actual rings at Kiso Sansen Park and learn the secret story and history of the formation of the rings. People outside the prefecture know that the ring is meant to prevent the flooding of the river, but they do not know what kind of hardships and processes it took to create it. It was not easy to make a wheel, and it took a lot of sacrifice, labor, and time to make it. That's why I want people who live in the details of the process and the surroundings to know their efforts and history, and to pass them on to future generations.
ーーーーーーーーーーーーーーーーーーーーーーーーーーーーーーーーーーーーーーーーーーーーーーーーー
After 1891, De Rijke was appointed an Imperial officer of the Meiji Home Ministry, where he rose to the position of Vice Minister in this Japanese government bureaucracy.  He later served as an instructor in the Imperial College of Engineering.

China
In 1876, De Rijke traveled to Shanghai to help develop plans to improve the navigability of Huangpu river, a tributary of Yangtze River, which is important to Shanghai's international trade.

In 1897, he returned to Shanghai for a second report of Huangpu river. In 1901, he returned to China to participate in the Yellow River flood control project.

In June 1906, he was officially appointed as the first chief engineer of the Whangpoo Conservancy Board. Before his return to the Netherlands in 1909, he carried out a number of riverway projects on Huangpu river, including the Wusong Jetty (built by the Huangpu's mouth) and the Gaoqiao new channel. His work successfully eliminated most of the shoals and achieved the preliminary goal of Huangpu channel improvement: the lowest water depth at Huangpu's mouth has been deepened from 15 ft to 21 ft, and in the Gaoqiao new channel from 2–3 ft to 19 ft.

Later life
De Rijke was awarded the Order of the Sacred Treasures, 2nd class, and returned to the Netherlands in 1903. In the Netherlands he was appointed Officer of the Order of Orange-Nassau and on January 13, 1911, to Knight in the Order of the Dutch Lion. In Belgium, he was knighted in the Order of Leopold

He died at the age of 70 in Amsterdam.  He is buried in the Zorgvlied cemetery in Amsterdam.

Honors
 Order of the Sacred Treasures, 1889 (4th class); 1892 (3rd class); 1903 (2nd class)
 Order of Orange-Nassau, 1911
 Order of the Dutch Lion, 1913
 Order of Leopold (Belgium)

Notes

References
 Kamibayashi, Yoshiyuki. "Two Dutch Engineers and Improvements of Public Works in Japan,"  Proceedings of the Third International Congress on Construction History, Cottbus, May 2009
 Karan, Pradyumna Prasad. (2005).  Japan in the 21st century: Environment, Economy, and Society. Lexington, Kentucky: University Press of Kentucky. ; ;  OCLC 254187082
 Nussbaum, Louis Frédéric and Käthe Roth. (2005). Japan Encyclopedia. Cambridge: Harvard University Press. ; OCLC 48943301

1842 births
1913 deaths
Dutch civil engineers
Dutch expatriates in Japan
Foreign advisors to the government in Meiji-period Japan
People from Noord-Beveland

Knights of the Order of the Netherlands Lion
Officers of the Order of Orange-Nassau